Avenida Rivadavia is one of the principal thoroughfares in Buenos Aires, Argentina, extending   from downtown Buenos Aires to the western suburb of Merlo.

History
Upon the designation of the Viceroyalty of the Río de la Plata by the Spanish Empire in 1776, the "Road of the Kingdom of Heaven" leading into Buenos Aires from the east was designated a Camino Real, a "Royal Road" fit for a Viceroy, and afforded improvements and some security. Dubbed Federation Road by the paramount Governor Juan Manuel de Rosas in 1836, it was renamed in honor of former President Bernardino Rivadavia in 1857, following the reestablishment of constitutional rule.

The Buenos Aires Metro, inaugurated in 1913, was extended to Rivadavia Avenue in 1926, whereby 11 of the 16 stations on line  were built underneath the avenue. Rivadavia was on Buenos Aires' first bus line in 1928, a development that marked the beginning of the end for the city's intricate trolley system.  The establishment of the National Highway Bureau in 1932 led to the 1935 designation of the avenue, west of the Federal District, as part of National Highway 7.  This change encouraged the rapid development of the suburbs west of Buenos Aires, something which, by 1970, had made the avenue among the most congested in the metro area.  A rerouting of Highway 7 north of the avenue began taking shape in the late 1970s and the resulting expressway between Buenos Aires and Luján was completed in 1988. Absent since 1962, a Historic Tramway Line was inaugurated along the Caballito section of Rivadavia Avenue in 1980.

Itinerary
Avenida Rivadavia begins at a crosswalk between the Casa Rosada and the State Intelligence Bureau, on the northeast corner of Buenos Aires' storied Plaza de Mayo.  Running westward along the plaza, the avenue passes along the National Bank of Argentina, the Metropolitan Cathedral of Buenos Aires and City Hall before entering the old financial district.

Crossing the pedestrian Calle Florida and the massive Avenida 9 de Julio, Rivadavia merges with Avenida de Mayo at Congressional Plaza, whereby it passes between the Argentine Congress and the Art nouveau Café El Molino. Passing through Plaza Miserere in the Balvanera area, nearby points of interest include the eclectic Venetian Casa de los Pavos Reales, and, in Almagro, the Art Nouveau Café Las Violetas. Along Rivadavia Park, in the Caballito area, the avenue affords a view of the Monument to Simón Bolívar, founding father to Bolivia, Colombia, Ecuador and Venezuela.

The thoroughfare continues through the Buenos Aires suburbs of Morón, Castelar, Ituzaingó, San Antonio de Padua and Merlo before crossing the Reconquista River and becoming Bartolomé Mitre Avenue. Mitre Avenue travels west another  before merging with Piovano Avenue in Moreno.

References

External links

 Official Province of Buenos Aires bulletin (Spanish)
 Historic Tramway in Caballito – Asociación Amigos del Tranvía (Spanish)

Balvanera
Streets in Buenos Aires